Suh Hoon (born 1954) is a South Korean government official who served as the Director of National Security Office from 2020 to 2022 and previously as the director of the National Intelligence Service from 2017 to 2020.

Overview 
In 1980, he started public service at the Ministry of National Security Planning with 17 public affairs and worked for National Intelligence Service for 28 years and 3 months until his retirement in March 2008. He was the third deputy of the Roh Moo-hyun administration after going through the Strategic Chief of the National Intelligence Service. In 2017, he was appointed as President Moon Jae-in's first director of National Intelligence Service. In July 2020 he was designated as Moon's second director of National Security Office replacing Chung Eui-yong.  This makes Suh as one of four people who continue to serve President Moon as cabinet minister or ministerial-level government official from the beginning of Moon's presidency in 2017 along with Hong Nam-ki, Kim Sang-jo and Kang Kyung-wha as of December 2020.

Education 

 BA in education, Seoul National University
 Johns Hopkins University Graduate School of International Politics
 Dongguk University Graduate School of North Korean Studies

Career 
 1996: Representative of Korean Peninsula Energy Development Organization
 February 2004: Chief of information security office of National Security Council
 December 2004: Chief Strategy Officer of the National Intelligence Service
 November 2006: The third deputy director of the National Intelligence Service Visiting Professor, Department of North Korean Studies, Ewha Womans University
 June 2017: Director of the 13th National Intelligence Service of South Korea
 July 2020: Director of National Security Office

Political activity 
 In March 2018, Suh visited Pyongyang, North Korea for discussing the required steps to denuclearization of North Korea
 Suh briefed Japanese Prime Minister Shinzo Abe and foreign minister the same month after his Pyongyang visit.
 Suh Hoon played a critical role in historical April 2018 inter-Korean summit. He also helped establish two previous first and second inter-Korean summits in 2000 and 2007, is seen as the country's prime expert on the subject with North Korea. He is known as the South Korean who met with the previous North Korean leader Kim Jong-il the most.
 In April 2018, Suh Hoon visited North Korea as a South Korean envoy for organising the historic inter-Korean summit. He entered North Korea with a high-level delegation of South Korean officials.

Arrest 
In December 2022 Hoon was arrested in South Korea on charges of tampering with evidence that was related to the killing of South Korean Ministry of Oceans and Fisheries official by North Korean espionage agents near the Northern Limit Line in September 2020.

See also 
 2018 North Korea–United States summit
 April 2018 inter-Korean summit
 May 2018 inter-Korean summit

References

|-

1954 births
Living people
Seoul National University alumni
Paul H. Nitze School of Advanced International Studies alumni
Dongguk University alumni
Experts on North Korea
Directors of the National Intelligence Service (South Korea)
People charged with crimes
H